The  is an extra stage section used in Japanese kabuki theater. It is a long, raised platform, running left of centre to the stage through the audience, connecting to the main stage. 

The  is typically used for character entrances and exits, though is also used for asides and scenes that do not take place in the location as scenes on the main stage; the  also typically features a trapdoor just before the runway meets the stage, placed to be visible to everyone in the audience, which is commonly used for character entrances. Some kabuki plays also require the use of two , running along the left and right of the audience.

History
It was not used in performances, but allowed actors to step into the audience after a performance to receive flowers, with the word  literally meaning "flower path."

Usages

It is here that exiting characters may say their final words, and entering characters may address the audience or the characters on stage. Since the  runs through the audience, it allows for a closer experience for the spectator than might normally be allowed by other forms of traditional theater.

Sumo

See also
Kabuki
Catwalk

References
Hanamichi (2001). Japanese Architecture and Art Net Users System (JAANUS). Accessed 30 July 2005.

Kabuki
Stagecraft
Stage terminology
1668 establishments in Asia
1660s introductions